Proline-rich nuclear receptor coactivator 2 is a protein that in humans is encoded by the PNRC2 gene.

References

Further reading

External links
 
 
 

Gene expression
Transcription coregulators